Mamotte! Lollipop is a 2006 Japanese anime television series based on Michiyo Kikuta's manga series of the same name. The story revolves around female protagonist Nina Yamada, a seventh grader who accidentally swallows the Crystal Pearl thinking it was candy. The pearl is the goal of a sorcery examination where the students must retrieve it to pass. But since Nina has swallowed the pearl, she is now the target. Two of the examinees decide to protect her from the other students while they work on a potion to extract the pearl from Nina.

The series was first broadcast on KAB between July and September 2006. The episodes were rebroadcast by Tokyo MX, KBS Kyoto, Sun Television, and several other stations within a few days of the initial broadcast.

Two pieces of theme music are used for the opening and closing of each episode. The opening theme is "Poppin' Heart ha Hitotsu Dake?" by Clover. The closing theme is "Kyun-Kyun-Panic" by MOSAIC.WAV.

On May 12, 2008, Funimation announced that it acquired Mamotte! Lollipop. Under the title Save Me! Lollipop, Funimation released the series as a single DVD box set on February 24, 2009.



Episode list

References

External links 
 Save Me! Lollipop official English language website by Funimation
 

Save Me Lollipop